1997 J.League Cup Final was the 5th final of the J.League Cup competition. The final was played at Júbilo Iwata Stadium in Shizuoka on November 22, 1997, and Kashima Soccer Stadium in Ibaraki on November 29. Kashima Antlers won the championship.

Match details

See also
1997 J.League Cup

References

J.League Cup
1997 in Japanese football
Kashima Antlers matches
Júbilo Iwata matches